The Canalside Rail Trail Bridge (also known as the New York, New Haven and Hartford Railroad (Turners Falls Branch) Bridge) is a former New York, New Haven and Hartford Railroad (Turner Falls Branch) rail bridge across the Connecticut River between
Deerfield and Montague, Massachusetts.  The bridge (Massachusetts numbers: D06033/M28019) is on the Massachusetts Historic Bridge Inventory as a "Historic Metal Truss Bridge", currently the sixth oldest metal truss bridge on the state-wide historic registry.  The Canalside Rail Trail, completed in Spring 2008, incorporates this bridge.

History and construction of the bridge

Originally built in 1880 by Keystone Bridge Co., Pittsburgh, Pennsylvania, two of its three spans were knocked off their piers by the floating Montague City Covered Bridge during the 1936 flood.  Subsequently, those spans were rebuilt and replaced in 1936 by the Phoenix Bridge Company, Phoenixville, Pennsylvania. The remaining span of the original bridge is the oldest surviving span across the Connecticut River. The older span is a Whipple truss design. The newer spans use a modified Warren truss design (vertical truss members are added to the traditional form of a Warren truss).

The bridge was refurbished in 2006 to be part of the new Canalside Rail Trail.  However, though the bridge can now be used, the refurbishing is not complete as of July 2007.  The western pier has some stones out of place and some stones fallen off.  There is currently work going on to fix this issue.

Image gallery

See also
 List of crossings of the Connecticut River

Notes

References

External links

 University of New Hampshire Library topographical image circa 1894

Bridges completed in 1880
Bridges in Franklin County, Massachusetts
Bridges over the Connecticut River
Montague, Massachusetts
Pedestrian bridges in Massachusetts
Rail trail bridges in the United States
Railroad bridges in Massachusetts
Iron bridges in the United States
Pratt truss bridges in the United States
Warren truss bridges in the United States